East Is West is a 1930 American pre-Code crime drama film produced and distributed by Universal. It was directed by Monta Bell and stars Lupe Vélez, Lew Ayres and Edward G. Robinson. It is based on a 1918 Broadway play, East is West, which starred Fay Bainter. A silent film version from 1922, also titled East Is West, starred Constance Talmadge.

E. Alyn Warren reprises his role from the silent version.

Plot
Ming Toy is on the auction block in China. She is saved by Billy and taken to San Francisco by Lo Sang Kee. To save her from deportation she is sold to Charlie Yong, the Chop Suey King. Billy kidnaps her with plans of marriage.

Cast
Lupe Vélez - Ming Toy
Lew Ayres - Billy Benson
Edward G. Robinson - Charlie Yong
E. Alyn Warren - Lo Sang Kee
Tetsu Komai - Hop Toy
Henry Kolker - Mr. Benson
Mary Forbes - Mrs. Benson
Edgar Norton - Thomas
Charles Middleton - Dr. Fredericks
Jean Hersholt - Man

References

External links

 
East Is West film synopsis at allmovie.com
Lobby poster

1930 films
1930 crime drama films
Films directed by Monta Bell
Universal Pictures films
American films based on plays
Remakes of American films
Sound film remakes of silent films
American crime drama films
1930s American films
1930s English-language films